Silene nuda is a species of flowering plant in the family Caryophyllaceae known by the common names western fringed catchfly and sticky catchfly.

It is native to the Sierra Nevada and Modoc Plateau of California, its distribution extending into Oregon and Nevada. It grows in forest, woodland, and scrub habitat, sometimes in saline soils.

The largest leaves are located in tufts around the caudex, each measuring up to 15 centimeters long by 3 wide. Smaller leaves occur farther up the stem.

Each flower is encapsulated in a hairy, veined calyx of fused sepals. The five long petals are pink and each has two lobes at the tip.

References

External links
Jepson Manual Treatment
USDA Plants Profile
Flora of North America
Photo gallery

nuda
Flora of California
Flora of Nevada
Flora of Oregon
Flora of the Great Basin
Flora of the Sierra Nevada (United States)
~
Endemic flora of the United States
Flora without expected TNC conservation status